Utricularia muelleri is a medium-sized, perennial suspended aquatic carnivorous plant that belongs to the genus Utricularia. U. muelleri is endemic to Australia and Papua New Guinea.

See also 
 List of Utricularia species

References 

Carnivorous plants of Australia
Carnivorous plants of Asia
Flora of Papua New Guinea
Flora of Queensland
Flora of the Northern Territory
Eudicots of Western Australia
muelleri
Lamiales of Australia